The Platino Awards, known in Spanish as Premios Platino del Cine Iberoamericano ("Platinum Prizes of Ibero-American Cinema"), are Ibero-America's annual film awards.

The awards were established in 2013, and the first awards ceremony took place on 5 April 2014 at the Teatro Anayasi, Panama City. The ceremony continues to take place annually between April and July, and awards are given to films produced during the previous year.

The award itself is a platinum figure with the shape of a woman offering the world with Latin America's map on the center, it was created by designer Javier Mariscal.

History 
To reward the best Ibero-American films of each year, the Entidad de Gestión de Derechos de los Productores Audiovisuales (EGEDA) along with the Federación Iberoamericana de Productores Cinematográficos y Audiovisuales (FIPCA) decided to create the Platino Awards. The inaugural ceremony took place on 5 April 2014 at the Anayasi theatre in Panama City. The Awards were created as a window to show and promote Ibero-America´s cinematography around the world.

Awards
The awards are currently delivered in 22 competitive-categories, 16 for film and 6 for television, with a maximum of four candidates for each category since the VI Edition (having been 7 candidates for the Best Film Award on the I Edition). A special award, the Honorary Award, is also presented.

Current categories

Honorary categories
 Platino Honorary Award

Discontinued categories
 Platino Award for Best Ibero-American Co-Production

Award ceremonies
The following is a listing of all Platino Awards ceremonies since 2014.

Countries
The countries that are allowed to submit their national films for consideration are the following:

Trivia

"Big Five" winners and nominees

Winners
No film has won the awards for Best Film, Director, Actor, Actress and Screenplay yet.

Nominees
Four awards won
 Wild Tales (2015): won Film, Director (Damián Szifron), Screenplay (Damián Szifron) and Actress (Érica Rivas); lost Actor (Leonardo Sbaraglia).
One award won
 The Club (2016): won Screenplay (Pablo Larraín, Guillermo Calderón and Daniel Villalobos); lost Film, Director (Pablo Larraín), Actor (Alfredo Castro) and Actress (Antonia Zegers).

Multiple wins
Films with two or more awards.

8 wins
 Wild Tales (2015)
7 wins
 Embrace of the Serpent (2016)
6 wins
 Pain and Glory (2020)
5 wins
 A Fantastic Woman (2018)
 Roma (2019)
 Forgotten We'll Be (2021)
4 wins
 A Monster Calls (2017)
 The Good Boss (2022)

3 wins
 Gloria (2014)
 The Distinguished Citizen (2017)
 Zama (2018)
 La llorona (2021)
 Parallel Mothers (2022)
2 wins
 Underdogs (2014)
 Julieta (2017)
 The Realm (2019)
 The Heiresses (2019)
 Monos (2020)
 Rosa's Wedding (2021)
 The Mole Agent (2021)

Multiple nominations
Films with four or more nominations.

14 nominations
 Argentina, 1985 (2023)
11 nominations
 La llorona (2021)
 Forgotten We'll Be (2021)
 The Good Boss (2022)
10 nominations
 Wild Tales (2015)
9 nominations
 Marshland (2015)
 A Fantastic Woman (2018)
 Roma (2019)
8 nominations
 Bad Hair (2015)
 Behavior (2015)
 Embrace of the Serpent (2016)
 Ixcanul (2016)
 Zama (2018)
 The Endless Trench (2020)
 Maixabel (2022)
7 nominations
 Mr. Kaplan (2015)
 A Monster Calls (2017)
 Last Days in Havana (2018)
 Pain and Glory (2020)
 While at War (2020)
6 nominations
 The Club (2016)
 A Twelve-Year Night (2019)
 Birds of Passage (2019)
 Schoolgirls (2021)
 Parallel Mothers (2022)
 The Beasts (2023)
 Lullaby (2023)
 Bardo, False Chronicle of a Handful of Truths (2023)

5 nominations
 The Clan (2016)
 The German Doctor (2014)
 Magallanes (2016)
 Truman (2016)
 Neruda (2017)
 Summer 1993 (2018)
 Champions (2019)
 The Heiresses (2019)
 Utama (2023)
4 nominations
 Gloria (2014)
 Living Is Easy with Eyes Closed (2014)
 The Distinguished Citizen (2017)
 Smoke & Mirrors (2017)
 Julieta (2017)
 The Thin Yellow Line (2017)
 From Afar (2017)
 The Bookshop (2018)
 The Summit (2018)
 The Realm (2019)
 Monos (2020)
 The Weasel's Tale (2020)
 Coven (2021)
 7 Prisoners (2022)
 1976 (2023)
 The Kings of the World (2023)

See also

 Latin American television awards
 Goya Awards
 Ariel Awards
 Sur Awards

References

External links
  Official Premios Platino website

 
Ibero-American awards